Marzio Masturzo ( 17th century) was an Italian painter of the Baroque period, active near his natal city of Naples. He was a pupil of Paolo Greco, then, along with Salvatore Rosa, a fellow-pupil of Aniello Falcone.
Like Falcone, he often painted battle scenes. He appears to have joined during the Masaniello revolt, a loose fraternity of artists called the Compagnia della morte involved in the rebellion.

References

17th-century Neapolitan people
17th-century Italian painters
Italian male painters
Painters from Naples
Italian Baroque painters
Italian battle painters